Oliver Tobias M. "Oli" Johnson (born 6 November 1987) is an English semi-professional footballer who plays as a striker for Bradford Park Avenue.

Career

Early career
Born in Wakefield, West Yorkshire, Johnson played in the Wakefield & District Sunday League with Shepherds Arms before starting his career with Nostell Miners Welfare in the Northern Counties East Football League Division One, the 10th tier of English football. His first goal of the 2006–07 season came with Nostell's opening goal in a 4–2 victory over AFC Emley on 21 October 2006. He finished the season with four goals as Nostell were promoted to the Northern Counties East Football League Premier Division. Johnson scored nine goals during the 2007–08 season.

Stockport County
After catching the attention of Stockport County during a pre-season friendly, he joined the League One club on 17 October 2008 after impressing on trial, signing a contract until the end of the 2008–09 season. He made his debut as part of a 2–1 loss against Colchester United. He made an instant impact at Stockport, scoring four goals in his first four starts for the club, including the winner against Cheltenham Town at Edgeley Park.

Norwich City
Johnson signed for Norwich City on a two-and-a-half-year contract for an undisclosed fee on 8 January 2010 and made his debut coming on as a late substitute in Norwich's 3–1 victory over Exeter City the following day. He scored his first goal for the club a week later in the 5–0 away victory against Colchester United.

Johnson joined Yeovil Town on an initial one-month loan on 14 January 2011, and made his debut as a substitute in the 1–0 win against Swindon Town on 15 January. His first goal for the club came against Brentford, helping Yeovil to a 2–1 win. He scored twice more for the club, including a volley in a 1–0 win against Tranmere Rovers. On 9 January 2012, Johnson's contract with Norwich was terminated by mutual consent.

Oxford United
Johnson joined Oxford United of League Two on 20 January 2012 on a contract until the end of the season. He scored his first goal for the club in a 2–1 home victory over Dagenham & Redbridge. In May 2012, Johnson was released after being deemed surplus to requirements.

York City

Johnson signed for newly promoted League Two side York City on a one-year contract on 26 June 2012. He made his debut as an 89th-minute substitute in York's 2–0 win away at Aldershot Town on 29 September 2012. Having suffered from stomach and groin problems, he was released by York on 28 February 2013, after making seven appearances for the club.

Guiseley
Johnson signed for Guiseley in the 2013–14 season and despite picking up numerous injuries, made several substitute appearances including a man-of-the-match performance against Colwyn Bay on 19 April 2014. In the 2014–15 season, Johnson became a key player for the club en route to promotion to the top level of non-league football, providing numerous match-winning displays most notably in the 3–0 away victory over former club Stockport County.

Career statistics

Honours

Player
Norwich City
Football League One: 2009–10

Guiseley
Conference North play-offs: 2014–15

Individual
Conference North Team of the Year: 2014–15

References

External links

1987 births
Living people
Footballers from Wakefield
English footballers
Association football forwards
Stockport County F.C. players
Norwich City F.C. players
Yeovil Town F.C. players
Oxford United F.C. players
York City F.C. players
Guiseley A.F.C. players
Northern Counties East Football League players
English Football League players
National League (English football) players
Black British sportspeople
Nostell Miners Welfare F.C. players
Bradford (Park Avenue) A.F.C. players